Zhongguo wenxue shi is a book about the history of Chinese literature by , published in 1904. It was the first known published history of Chinese literature in Chinese.

The book focused on classical prose, and did not significantly explore works of fiction nor poetry.

According to Giovanni Vitello of the University of Naples "L'Orientale", due to the cultural difference in what "wenxue" meant in pre-1920s China, in this case how "humanities" was defined by the Imperial Edict of 1903, the work "was not exactly a "history" of Chinese literature as we would understand it today".

In 1922 Zheng Zhenduo criticized the book for having a title he felt was misleading.

References

Further reading
 
 
1904 books
Chinese literature